Thee Friendship Village E.P. is an EP by godheadSilo, released on July 7, 1993 by Kill Rock Stars. The record in its entirety was later released on the 1995 compilation Elephantitus of the Night.

Track listing

Personnel 

godheadSilo
 Dan Haugh – drums
 Mike Kunka – bass guitar

Technical personnel
 godheadSilo – mixing
 Tim Green – recording
 Michael Lastra – recording
 Joe Preston – recording

Release history

References 

1993 EPs
GodheadSilo albums
Kill Rock Stars EPs